Honor was a Polish Rock Against Communism (RAC) band. Their lyrical themes are related to Nazism, neopaganism and the white power skinhead movement. Until 1999, the band played typical RAC, and then moved to pagan metal music. In January 2002, vocalist Mariusz Szczerski was arrested for spreading neo-Nazism and antisemitism. After his death from a car accident in 2005, the band stopped playing. The band reformed in 2015 and has played since, albeit in the previous RAC style. Honor is on the Anti-Defamation League List of Hate Music Groups.

Former members 
 Olaf Jasiński – guitar, bass
 Mariusz "Szczery" Szczerski  – vocals
 Piotr Marcinowski – drums
 Janusz Filipowski – drums
 Karol Cegliński – bass

Session musicians 
 Robert "Rob Darken" Fudali – keyboards
 Paweł "Stormblast" Pietrzak – drums during shows
 Zyklon – bass during shows

Discography

See also 
 List of neo-Nazi bands
 Far-right politics in Poland

References

Polish rock music groups
Neo-Nazi musical groups
Neo-Nazism in Poland